The Dearborn Public Schools is a school district that includes the entire city of Dearborn, Michigan and a small portion of Dearborn Heights, both in Greater Detroit. Dearborn Public Schools is the third largest school district in Michigan, serving 20,000 students. The district had a $233 million budget for 2021.

Operations
In the fall of 2021, the district moved start times later for all students. The district runs a three-tier busing system meaning a single bus may pick up and deliver high school, middle school and then elementary school students.

Demographics
After decades of slow growth, Dearborn Public Schools has seen its enrollment stabilize in recent years.  Enrollment was just over 20,000 students for the 2020-21 school year.  About 46 percent of the district’s students are considered English Language Learners. The community includes a large Arab American population, and Arabic is the most common second language in the district after English. From 2000 to 2010, during a time of growth in the Arab American community, the enrollment of DPS increased from 17,000 to 18,500. This occurred even though the number of households in Dearborn declined during the same period.

In a thirty-year period ending sometime prior to 2010 the district and Detroit Public Schools both developed policies to accommodate Arab and Muslim students in collaboration with administrators, parents, teachers, and students. Policies adopted by the districts included observances of Muslim holidays, Arabic-language programs, policies concerning prayer, and rules regarding modesty of females in physical education and sports.

About 70 percent of the families in the district are low-income.  Dearborn Public Schools offers free school lunch and breakfast to most of its kindergarten through 12th grade students through the Community Eligibility Program of the National School Lunch Program. All school meals in the district are halal and nut free, with a vegetarian option available at each meal.

Academic performance
Five schools in the district received National Blue Ribbon Schools Awards from the U.S. Department of Education from 2017 through 2021, including Iris Becker Elementary in 2017, STEM Middle School in 2018, Charles A. Lindbergh Elementary in 2019, and Haigh Elementary and Henry Ford Early College in 2021.

Early college programs
Dearborn Public Schools offers four early college programs through a partnership with Henry Ford College.  All four programs allow students to attend school for five years to complete both a high school diploma and some college, potentially earning an associate degree, trade certification or college credits to apply toward a bachelor degree.  Three of the programs - Henry Ford Early College, Henry Ford Early College Advanced Manufacturing and Henry Ford Early College School of Education - focus on specific career areas and are housed on the Henry Ford College campus.  The fourth program, Henry Ford Collegiate Academy, allows students to attend their home high school full-time for two years before starting to transition to college classes.

List of Schools  

Elementary Schools (19)
Becker
DuVall
Geer Park
Haigh
Henry Ford
Howard
Howe Montessori and Center Based Education
Lindbergh
Long
Maples
McDonald
Miller
Nowlin
Oakman
River Oaks
Salina Elementary
Snow
Whitmore-Bolles
William Ford

K-8 schools (2) 
Lowrey
McCollough/Unis

Intermediate Schools (1)
Salina Intermediate

Middle Schools (5) 
Bryant
O.L. Smith
STEM
Stout
Woodworth

High Schools (3) 
Dearborn
Edsel Ford
Fordson

Specialized High Schools

 Dearborn Magnet High School
 Henry Ford Early College
 Henry Ford Early College Advanced Manufacturing

Special high school programs
Dearborn Center for Math, Science and Technology (DCMST)
Henry Ford Collegiate Academy
Michael Berry Career Center
(Previously Dearborn Schools ran Clara B. Ford High School at Vista Maria, a facility for troubled girls and the School-to-Work Academy alternative high school)

Special Schools (4) 
Cotter Early Childhood (preschool)
STEM Middle School (Science, Technology, Engineering, and Math) - a magnet school for middle school
Dearborn Public Schools Virtual K-12  - an all online school started in 2021
Howe Montessori and Center Based Education - a preschool through elementary Montessori and a special education center 

Defunct Schools 
Clark (elementary school) - This school has been razed.
Garrison, later renamed Salisbury (elementary school) - now Imam Mahdi Association Of Marajeya 
Howe (elementary school) - Programs moved to Dearborn Heights Campus. Building sold and demolished in 2019.
Lapham (elementary school) - Now the West Village Academy.
Miller #1 (elementary school) - This school was razed and replaced on the same site by Miller #2.
Oxford Avenue (elementary school) - This school has been razed.
Roulo (elementary school) - This school has been razed.
Ten Eyck (elementary school) - Now administrative offices for the school district.
Thayer (elementary school) - Now the Society of St. Paul's.
William Ford #1 (elementary school) - This school was razed and replaced on the same site by William Ford #2.
Adams (middle school) / original Dearborn High - Most of the original structure is still standing and is currently used for private offices.
Edison (middle school) - This school has been razed.

See also

List of high schools in Michigan

Notes

External links
 

School districts in Michigan
Education in Dearborn, Michigan
Education in Wayne County, Michigan
Dearborn Heights, Michigan